John Noseda (18 March 1948 – 13 November 2022) was a Swiss politician. A member of the Democratic People's Party and later the Swiss Socialist Party, he served in the Grand Council of Ticino from 1979 to 1999.

Noseda died in Lugano on 13 November 2022.

References

1948 births
2022 deaths
20th-century Swiss politicians
Christian Democratic People's Party of Switzerland politicians
Social Democratic Party of Switzerland politicians
University of Geneva alumni
People from Mendrisio